Ross G. Montgomery (September 26, 1888 at Toledo, Ohio – February 14, 1969 at Los Angeles, California) was a Los Angeles-based architect, illustrator, and historian.

Biography

Montgomery designed the original St. Ambrose Church in West Hollywood, California, the St. Andrew's Catholic Church in Pasadena, California, and the St. Cecilia Catholic Church in Los Angeles, California. Additionally, he helped redesign the Mission Santa Barbara after the 1925 Santa Barbara earthquake. He also designed the stucco mausoleum of the Calvary Cemetery in East Los Angeles. Together with William Mullay, he designed Our Lady of Mount Carmel Catholic Church in Montecito, California in the late 1930s.

As an architectural historian, he wrote about the Awatovi Ruins.

The original publication by Ross Montgomery related to the Awatovi Expedition of the late 1930s was included in Volume 36 of Harvard University Peabody Museum of Archaeology & Ethnology Papers.

References

Architects from Los Angeles
1888 births
1969 deaths
Artists from Toledo, Ohio